As of 2019, the Institute of Electrical and Electronics Engineers (IEEE) has 5,082 members designated Fellow, each of whom is associated with one of the 41 societies under the IEEE. The Fellow grade of membership is the highest level of membership, and cannot be applied for directly by the member – instead the candidate must be nominated by others. This grade of membership is conferred by the IEEE board of directors in recognition of a high level of demonstrated extraordinary accomplishment.

Aerospace and Electronic Systems Society
See List of fellows of IEEE Aerospace and Electronic Systems Society
Antennas & Propagation Society
See List of fellows of IEEE Antennas & Propagation Society
IEEE Broadcast Technology Society
See List of fellows of IEEE Broadcast Technology Society
Circuits and Systems Society
See List of fellows of IEEE Circuits and Systems Society
Communications Society
See List of fellows of IEEE Communications Society
Components, Packaging & Manufacturing Technology Society
See List of fellows of IEEE Components, Packaging & Manufacturing Technology Society
Computational Intelligence Society
See List of fellows of IEEE Computational Intelligence Society
Computer Society
See List of fellows of IEEE Computer Society
Consumer Electronics Society
See List of fellows of IEEE Consumer Electronics Society
Control Systems Society
See List of fellows of IEEE Control Systems Society
Dielectrics & Electrical Insulation Society
See List of fellows of IEEE Dielectrics & Electrical Insulation Society
Education Society
See List of fellows of IEEE Education Society
Electromagnetic Compatibility Society
See List of fellows of IEEE Electromagnetic Compatibility Society
Electron Devices Society
See List of fellows of IEEE Electron Devices Society
Engineering in Medicine and Biology Society
See List of fellows of IEEE Engineering in Medicine and Biology Society
Geoscience and Remote Sensing Society
See List of fellows of IEEE Geoscience and Remote Sensing Society
Industrial Electronics Society
See List of fellows of IEEE Industrial Electronics Society
Industry Applications Society
See List of fellows of IEEE Industry Applications Society
Information Theory Society
See List of fellows of IEEE Information Theory Society
Instrumentation & Measurement Society
See List of fellows of IEEE Instrumentation & Measurement Society
Intelligent Transportation Systems Society
See List of fellows of IEEE Intelligent Transportation Systems Society
Magnetics Society
See List of fellows of IEEE Magnetics Society
Microwave Theory and Techniques Society
See List of fellows of IEEE Microwave Theory and Techniques Society
Nuclear and Plasma Sciences Society
See List of fellows of IEEE Nuclear and Plasma Sciences Society
Oceanic Engineering Society
See List of fellows of IEEE Oceanic Engineering Society
Photonics Society
See List of fellows of IEEE Photonics Society
Power Electronics Society
See List of fellows of IEEE Power Electronics Society
Power & Energy Society
See List of fellows of IEEE Power & Energy Society
Product Safety Engineering Society
See List of fellows of IEEE Product Safety Engineering Society
Professional Communication Society
See List of fellows of IEEE Professional Communication Society
Reliability Society
See List of fellows of IEEE Reliability Society
Robotics and Automation Society
See List of fellows of IEEE Robotics and Automation Society
Signal Processing Society
See List of fellows of IEEE Signal Processing Society
Society on Social Implications of Technology
See List of fellows of IEEE Society on Social Implications of Technology
Solid-State Circuits Society
See List of fellows of IEEE Solid-State Circuits Society
Systems, Man & Cybernetics Society
See List of fellows of IEEE Systems, Man & Cybernetics Society
Ultrasonics, Ferroelectrics & Frequency Control Society
See List of fellows of IEEE Ultrasonics, Ferroelectrics & Frequency Control Society
Technology and Engineering Management Society
See List of fellows of IEEE Technology and Engineering Management Society
Vehicular Technology Society
See List of fellows of IEEE Vehicular Technology Society

References